Saint Clere is an unincorporated community in Pottawatomie County, Kansas, United States.

History
A post office was opened in Saint Clere in 1874, and remained in operation until it was discontinued in 1953.

Education
The community is served by Onaga USD 322 (north side of road) and Kaw Valley USD 321 (south side of road) public school districts.

Notable people
Heavyweight boxing champion Jess Willard was born in Saint Clere.

References

Further reading

External links
 Pottawatomie County maps: Current, Historic, KDOT

Unincorporated communities in Pottawatomie County, Kansas
Unincorporated communities in Kansas